Christian Horace Benedict Alfred Moquin-Tandon (7 May 1804 – 15 April 1863) was a French naturalist and doctor.

Moquin-Tandon was professor of zoology at Marseille from 1829 until 1833, when he was appointed professor of botany and director of the botanical gardens at Toulouse.  In 1850, he was sent by the French government to Corsica to study the island's flora.  In 1853, he moved to Paris, later becoming director of the Jardin des Plantes and the Académie des Sciences.

His books included L'Histoire Naturelle des Iles Canaries (1835–44), co-authored with Philip Barker Webb and Sabin Berthelot.

One of his specialities was the family Amaranthaceae (The Amaranth family).

Several genera of plants have been named in his honour, including in 1838, DC. published Moquinia, a genus of flowering plants from Brazil, in the Moquinia tribe within the sunflower family. Then in 1954, Simone Balle published Moquiniella a genus of flowering plants from Africa, belonging to the family Loranthaceae. Lastly in 2013, botanists (Cabrera) G.Sancho published Moquiniastrum, a genus of flowering plants from South America, belonging to the family Asteraceae.

Bibliography 

 Moquin-Tandon A. (1855–1856). Histoire naturelle des mollusques terrestres et fluviatiles de France, contenant des études générales sur leur anatomie et leur physiologie et la description particulière des genres, des espèces et des variétés. (4-5), 368 pp., J.-B. Baillière, Paris.
 volume 1
 volume 2

References

External links
 Short biography
 

French naturalists
1804 births
1863 deaths
Members of the French Academy of Sciences